

The Chelidon (Χελιδών, meaning 'Swallow' in Greek, also spelled in English as Helithon) was the first airplane developed by the Greek EAF (KEA) aircraft factory with management provided by Blackburn Aircraft Limited at the time. As mentioned in the contemporary Jane's edition, it was designed largely by Greeks (under the supervision of Mr. Charles H. Lowe-Wylde), according to Greek Navy specifications. The development of the Chelidon was completed in the virtually record time of eight weeks, and the first flight was made on 20 February 1927, as a two-seater military biplane designed for advanced training and other roles including reconnaissance and could also be transformed into a hydroplane.

An order was originally placed in December 1926, by the Greek Navy, for 18 aircraft but no further production followed, as, after the three-month test flight period, it was considered inferior to alternative proposed models. The example built was used for technical personnel training at KEA and was probably scrapped in 1938.

Specifications (Chelidon)

References

Further reading

Greek ERGA magazine, December 15, 1926 issue (info about Greek Navy order)

1920s Greek military trainer aircraft